The Syrian national youth handball team is the national under–18 handball team of Syria. It is controlled by the Syrian Arab Handball Federation, and is an affiliate of the International Handball Federation as well as a member of the Asian Handball Federation. The team represents Syria in international matches.

Tournament record

Youth Olympic Games 

 Champions   Runners up   Third place   Fourth place

Asian Championship record 
 Champions   Runners up   Third place   Fourth place

References

Handball in Syria
Men's national youth handball teams
Handball